The Federal Reserve Bulletin is a bulletin from the Federal Reserve Board started in 1914, intended as a vehicle to present policy issues.

Content

According to the "About" section of the Bulletin's website: "Authors from the Federal Reserve Board's Research and Statistics, Monetary Affairs, International Finance, Banking Supervision and Regulation, Consumer and Community Affairs, Reserve Bank Operations, and Legal divisions contribute to the content published in the Bulletin, which includes topical research and analysis and quarterly "Legal Developments.""

Historically, the Federal Reserve Bulletin was published monthly as a paper bulletin, and then as an online bulletin. However, regular publication was discontinued after 2006. Currently, individual bulletin articles are released online. The schedule includes four "Legal Developments" articles, one for each quarter, but there is no predetermined schedule for the release of other articles. All articles released in a particular calendar year form one volume of the bulletin, that can be purchased in print or downloaded in full online.

Accessibility

All volumes and articles of the bulletin can be accessed freely online. Print versions can be ordered for a fee.

The Federal Reserve Bulletin archives are also available through FRASER.

History

The Federal Reserve Bulletin started out in 1914. Started May 1915, paper bulletins were released monthly. The practice of monthly publication continued without break until December 2003. In 2004 and 2005, the bulletin was published on a quarterly schedule. In 2006, publication was on a bi-annual schedule. Starting 2007, individual articles were simply released online and all articles released in a given year were compiled into a volume at the end of the year.

The Federal Reserve Board used to publish a Statistical Supplement to the Federal Reserve Bulletin, both print and online, but announced in December 2008 that it was discontinuing the Statistical Supplement, and instead pointed people to a detailed list of links to the most up-to-date data on the economy of the United States.

References

External links
 
 Digitized issues of the Bulletin, 1915-2009
Economy of the United States